Brachygobius xanthomelas is a species of goby from the subfamily Gobionellinae which occurs in Peninsular Malaysia, Singapore and on the island of Borneo. It is a little known species which occurs in the aquarium trade.

References 

Fish of Thailand
xanthomelas
Fish described in 1937